The National Archives of Uruguay also called Archivo General de la Nación is located in Montevideo, Uruguay. It was established in 1926.

Directors 

 Alicia Casas de Barran

See also 
 List of national archives

External links 
 http://www.agn.gub.uy

Uruguay
Archives in Uruguay